Frank D. Boston, Jr. (December 5, 1938 – May 10, 2011) was an American politician who served in the Maryland House of Delegates and a chairman of the powerful Baltimore City Delegation. Boston was one of three delegates serving the 41st legislative district, which lies in the central, northwest section of Baltimore City.

Background
Frank Boston was born in Baltimore, Maryland, December 5, 1938. He attended Frederick Douglass Senior High School (Baltimore, Maryland) and later received a bachelor's degree from the University of Maryland in 1973. Boston also received a master's degree in education from the Johns Hopkins University in 1979. Boston was a vocational evaluator and teacher with the Baltimore City Public School System. He was a president of Local 1694, American Federation of State, County and Municipal Employees (AFSCME); Council 92 and a member of the  American Federation of Labor & Congress of Industrial  Organizations (AFL-CIO). Member, Maryland State Teachers Association; Baltimore Teachers Union. Member, Maryland Democratic State Central Committee; Baltimore City Democratic Central Committee, 1982–86, 1994–98, 1998–. Member, The Windsor Democratic Organization. He was also a member of the Meritocrats. Married; two children.

In the Legislature
Boston was appointed to the House of Delegates after He represented District 41 (D) in Baltimore City from 1987 to 1999. Boston's first committee assigned was the House Constitutional and Administrative Law Committee in 1987. In 1991 he joined the House Judiciary Committee and served there for two years. He then served for one year on the Commerce and Government Matters Committee  (1994), and finished his career on the Economic Matters Committee (1995–1999). Boston was a leader on the House floor as well, serving as Deputy Majority Whip from 1992 to 1994. He was Chairman of the Baltimore City Delegation and a member of the Legislative Black Caucus of Maryland.

References

External links
 

Members of the Maryland House of Delegates
African-American state legislators in Maryland
Politicians from Baltimore
1938 births
2011 deaths
University of Maryland, College Park alumni
University of Maryland Eastern Shore alumni
Johns Hopkins University alumni
20th-century African-American people
21st-century African-American people